Hermann Leitner (3 September 1927–22 February 2013) was an Austrian film editor and film director. His 1962 documentary film Mediterranean Holiday was entered into the 3rd Moscow International Film Festival.

Selected filmography
Editor
 Viennese Girls (1945)
 Shadows Over Naples (1951)
  Captive Soul (1952)
  I Can't Marry Them All (1952)
 Queen of the Arena (1952)
 Shame on You, Brigitte! (1952)
 Lady's Choice (1953)
 Hit Parade (1953)
 The Empress of China (1953)
 Not Afraid of Big Animals (1953)
 Hooray, It's a Boy! (1953)
 The Flower of Hawaii (1953)
 Emil and the Detectives (1954)
 Victoria in Dover (1954)
 It Was Always So Nice With You (1954)
  The Beautiful Miller (1954)
 Love is Forever (1954)
 Love Is Just a Fairytale (1955)
 The Three from the Filling Station (1955)
 Wenn der Vater mit dem Sohne (1955)
 Charley's Aunt (1956)

Director
  (1957)
  (1957)
  (1958)
 Glück und Liebe in Monaco (1959)

 Verdammt die jungen Sünder nicht (1961)
 Mediterranean Holiday (1962)
 Drei Frauen im Haus (1968–1969, TV series)
 Der Kurier der Kaiserin (1970–1971, TV series)
 Die Melchiors (1972, TV series)
  (1976, TV film)
 Sun, Wine and Hard Nuts (1977–1981, TV series)
 Waldheimat (1983–1984, TV series)
 ...Erbin sein - dagegen sehr (1985, TV series)
 Roda Roda (1992–1993, TV series)
 Blankenese (1994, TV series)

Bibliography
 Körner, Torsten. Der kleine Mann als Star: Heinz Rühmann und seine Filme der 50er Jahre. Campus Verlag, 2001.

References

External links

1927 births
2013 deaths
Austrian film editors
Austrian film directors
Austrian television directors
Film people from Salzburg